Savolainen osakunta (SavO) is one of the 15 student nations at the University of Helsinki, Finnish-speaking and established in 1905.

References

External links